MG Road or Mahatma Gandhi Road formerly known as James Street is a road in Secunderabad, Hyderabad, India.

It leads to a warren of streets called Tobacco Bazaar and Pot Market. Major landmarks include Paradise Hotel, Kabra Jewellers, Gandhi Statue, Chermas, Asrani Hotel, Paradise X roads, KFC, Ramgopalpet Police Station and Malani Building.

History
This road was named James Street after the Resident James Kirkpatrick. Later after independence, the street was renamed as  Mahatma Gandhi Road.

Commercial area
MG Road is one of the foremost shopping areas in Secunderabad. The General Bazaar and Cloth Market off this road are familiar haunts for shoppers and bargain hunters.

Recently hotels have come up on this road  including Tirupati's famous Hotel Bhima's.

MG Road is home to numerous global brands. Leading brands have their showrooms located here. Some of these establishments are:

Cherma's: One of Secunderabad's oldest apparel retail stores.
Honda Cars: Sundaram Motors - This is Honda's largest Honda car dealership in Secunderabad.
Philips Light Lounge and Philips Light Studio: Ved Electricals (Ved Group) - This is Philips' largest Philips Light Lounge and Philips Light Studio in Telangana.
Theaters: There used to be many theaters on MG Road like Alankar, Chitrani, and Paradise e.t.c. later these turned into shopping malls and restaurant, Famous Paradise restaurant is one of them, which used to be connected hotel to Paradise theater.

General Bazaar

Gold Market The area is famous for gold and jewellery shops where one can buy traditional handmade jewellery. Gold market is flourishing here since 150 years.

The area is studded with Zari/Kanchi Saree shops and  Wedding related shops. The area has also big shopping names like Bomanna, Chandana Bros, etc.

There is an offshoot road towards the west which takes to the Begumpet Airport, and the road is the place where Sir Ronald Ross is said to have discovered the cause of malaria.

Transport

MMTS Train station is called as James Street.

MG Road is well connected by the state-owned TSRTC buses to all parts of the city. There are plenty of buses since it lies between Rani Gunj bus depot and Secunderabad station.

Landmarks
Major landmarks include Gandhi Statue, Chermas, Asrani Hotel, Paradise X roads, KFC, Ramgopalpet Police Station and Malani Building. Parsi Fire Temple is also situated along this road.

Police Station
The M.G. Road in Secunderabad was earlier known as James Street. The Police Station was designed by Dewan Bahadur Ramgopal Malani who donated it to the Police Department for its use. According to an Andhra Pradesh government order dated 23 March 1998 the clock and the police station building were designated as heritage buildings.

See also 
 Tourist attractions in Hyderabad
 M G Road, Bangalore
 Brigade Road

References

Roads in Hyderabad, India
Neighbourhoods in Hyderabad, India
Transport in Secunderabad
Geography of Secunderabad